Macalister, MacAlister, MacAllister and their variants are forms of a Gaelic surname which means 'son of Alisdair'. The name originated in Scotland and belonged to a branch of the Clan Donald; they became an independent clan in 1493. From about the thirteenth century, MacAlisters were settling in the Glens of Northern Ireland, and they became numerous there. 

It can refer to the following people:

MacAlister 
 Donald MacAlister (1854–1934), physician, and former chancellor of the University of Glasgow
 John Young Walker MacAlister (1856–1925), British librarian
 Ian MacAlister Stewart, 13th Laird of Achnacone
 Katie MacAlister (born 1964), Seattle-area writer
 Patrick MacAlister (1826–1895), Irish Roman Catholic Prelate and 24th Lord Bishop of Down and Connor

Macalister
 Arthur Macalister (1818–1883), thrice Premier of Queensland, Australia
 Very Rev D. M. Macalister (1832–1909), Moderator of the General Assembly of the Free Church of Scotland 1902
 David Macalister Silva (born 1986), Colombian footballer
 John Kenneth Macalister (1914–1944), Canadian hero of World War II
 Norman Macalister, former lieutenant-governor of Prince of Wales Isle
 R. A. Stewart Macalister (1870–1950), Irish archaeologist
 Robert Macalister (1890–1967), former mayor of Wellington 
 Robert Alexander Stewart Macalister

MacAllister 
 Dylan Macallister (born 1982), Australian footballer
 Heather MacAllister, American writer
 Heather MacAllister (activist) (1968–2007), American performer and activist

Mac Allister 
A family of Argentine footballers:
 First generation:
 Patricio Mac Allister (born 1966)
 Carlos Mac Allister (born 1968), brother of Patricio and also a politician
 Second generation, all sons of Carlos:
 Francis Mac Allister (born 1995)
 Kevin Mac Allister (born 1997)
 Alexis Mac Allister (born 1998)

Places
Macalister, Queensland, a town in Australia
Macalister, an electoral district in the Legislative Assembly of Queensland, Australia, created in the 2017 redistribution

See also 
 Macalester
 McAlister
 McAllister (surname)
 Clan MacAlister, a Highland Scottish clan and a branch of Clan Donald

Anglicised Scottish Gaelic-language surnames